

In Greek mythology, Pontus was an ancient, pre-Olympian sea-god, one of the Greek primordial deities. Pontus was Gaia's son and has no father; according to the Greek poet Hesiod, he was born without coupling, though according to Hyginus, Pontus is the son of Aether and Gaia.

Mythology
For Hesiod, Pontus seems little more than a personification of the sea, ho pontos ("the sea"), by which Hellenes signified the Mediterranean Sea. After the castration of his brother, Uranus, Pontus, with his mother Gaia, fathered Nereus (the Old Man of the Sea), Thaumas (the awe-striking "wonder" of the Sea, embodiment of the sea's dangerous aspects), Phorcys and his sister-consort Ceto, and the "Strong Goddess" Eurybia. With the sea goddess Thalassa (whose own name simply means "sea" but is derived from a Pre-Greek root), he fathered the Telchines and all sea life.

In a Roman sculpture of the 2nd century AD, Pontus, rising from seaweed, grasps a rudder with his right hand and leans on the prow of a ship. He wears a mural crown, and accompanies Fortuna, whose draperies appear at the left, as twin patron deities of the Black Sea port of Tomis in Moesia.

Family tree

Sources

Hesiod

Hyginus

See also
List of water deities
Pontus (region)

Notes

References 

 Gantz, Timothy, Early Greek Myth: A Guide to Literary and Artistic Sources, Johns Hopkins University Press, 1996, Two volumes:  (Vol. 1),  (Vol. 2).
 Grimal, Pierre, The Dictionary of Classical Mythology, Wiley-Blackwell, 1996. .
 Gaius Julius Hyginus, Fabulae from The Myths of Hyginus translated and edited by Mary Grant. University of Kansas Publications in Humanistic Studies. Online version at the Topos Text Project.
 Hesiod, Theogony from The Homeric Hymns and Homerica with an English Translation by Hugh G. Evelyn-White, Cambridge, MA.,Harvard University Press; London, William Heinemann Ltd. 1914. Online version at the Perseus Digital Library. Greek text available from the same website.

Greek sea gods
Sea and river gods
Children of Gaia
Consorts of Gaia
Personifications in Greek mythology
Greek primordial deities